Holidays in the Danger Zone: America Was Here is a four-part travel documentary on Central America and Southeast Asia, part of the Holidays in the Danger Zone series, produced and broadcast by BBC This World. Written and presented by Ben Anderson, and produced by Will Daws. It was first broadcast in Jun 2007, on BBC Four.

Episode 1: Vietnam
Episode 2: Cambodia
Episode 3: Nicaragua and Honduras
Episode 4: El Salvador and Panama

In the series, Anderson visits a series of countries that the United States has either invaded, interfered with or occupied during the Cold War.

See also
 Holidays in the Danger Zone
 Holidays in the Axis of Evil 
 The Violent Coast
 Rivers 
 Meet the Stans
 Places That Don't Exist

References

External links 
 BBC-World's re-broadcast page includes a synopsis for each of the four segments.

BBC television documentaries
BBC World News shows
Documentaries about politics
Television shows filmed in Vietnam
Television shows filmed in Cambodia
Television shows filmed in Nicaragua
Television shows filmed in Honduras
Television shows filmed in El Salvador
Television shows filmed in Panama